The Varman dynasty of Kannauj was a dynasty that ruled Kannauj and the surrounding areas from the mid 7th century to the late 8th century. It was founded by Yashovarman, who filled the power vacuum created after emperor Harshavardhana's death.

History

Establishment
The city of Kannauj had previously been ruled by emperor Harshavardhana, who died without an heir and thus created a power vacuum. This lasted for around a century before Yashovarman emerged as its ruler. Alexander Cunningham, an archaeologist of the British Raj period, speculated on possible rulers of Kannauj during the period between Harsha and Yashovarman but there is little evidence to support his claims. Much of information on him is derived from the Gaudavaho (Slaying of the king of Gauda), a Prakrit-language poem written by his court poet Vakpati. According to the Jain chronicles, Yashovarman had a son named Āma, who succeeded him as the king of Kannauj during 749-753 CE.

Expansion
The dynasty reached its greatest extent and zenith of prosperity only under its founder, Yashovarman. The Gaudavaho depicts Yashovarman as conquering large swathes of northern India — including Bihar, Bengal, the western Deccan, Indus Valley and Kashmir — before returning in triumph to Kannauj. However, Kalhana, a Kashmiri court chronicler who lived around the 12th century CE, gives a very different story in his Rajatarangini, depicting Yashovarman as a ruler who was among those defeated by Lalitaditya Muktapida, a very powerful Karkota ruler of Kashmir.

Although R. C. Majumdar is among those who are wary of the ancient accounts of conquests, he believes that Yashovarman was "unquestionably the most powerful king [in the region] about this time."

Decline
Yashovarman's successors did not expand the kingdom and were all weak kings, who did not pay much attention to administration. They are considered as unsuccessful rulers. Āma, Dunduka, and Bhoja are considered as insignificant rulers, who achieved nothing of importance and reigned for 15-20 years. The last king, Bhoja was probably defeated by the Ayudhas, who established a new dynasty.

List of rulers
 Suryavarman (c. 710-725 CE), whose daughter Vasati married the Panduvamshi king  Harshagupta of Dakshina Kosala.
 Yashovarman (c. 725–752 CE), founder of dynasty
 Āma
 Dunduka
 Bhoja (ruled till 770 CE), last ruler of dynasty

References

States and territories established in the 7th century
States and territories disestablished in the 8th century
Empires and kingdoms of India
Dynasties of India
Former empires in Asia